is a Japanese actress, voice actress and narrator. She is signed to the Mausu Promotion agency.

Career
Under the stage name Chihaya Saeki, in 2005 she joined the Takarazuka Revue, where she was an otokoyaku in the Snow Troupe. She left the Takarazuka Revue in 2009 and began performing under her real name. She was a finalist in the Miss Universe Japan competition in 2012. She became part of the cast of Kirakira PreCure a la Mode in 2017.

Filmography

Television animation
2010s
Cross Ange (2014), Hikaru
Kirakira PreCure a la Mode (2017), Akira Kenjō / Cure Chocolat
Sakura Quest (2017), Angelica
Megalobox (2018), Yukiko Shirato
Sirius the Jaeger (2018), Dorothea
Bloom Into You (2018), Miyako Kodama
Fruits Basket (2019), Akimoto
2020s
Magia Record (2020), Kanae Yukino
Megalobox 2: Nomad (2021), Yukiko Shirato
Lupin the 3rd Part 6 (2022), Arianna
Shinobi no Ittoki (2022), Kominami Mitsuhashi
The Iceblade Sorcerer Shall Rule the World (2023), Abby Garnet
World Dai Star (2023), Noa Hiiragi

Theatrical animation

 No Game No Life Zero (2017), Rafil

Pretty Cure Dream Stars! (2017), Akira Kenjo / Cure Chocolat
KiraKira PreCure à la Mode: Crisply! The Memory of Mille-feuille! (2017), Akira Kenjō / Cure Chocolat

Net animation
2020s
Japan Sinks: 2020 (2020), Nami Miura
JoJo's Bizarre Adventure: Stone Ocean (2021), Shaved Head Prisoner
Kotaro Lives Alone (2022), Nozaki

Video games
Street Fighter V (2016), Satsuki
Spider-Man (2018), Mary Jane Watson
Soulcalibur VI (2018), Taki
Fate/Grand Order (2018), Prince of Lanling
Magia Record (2018), Kanae Yukino
The Curse of Kudan (2019), Sawako Iwami
Dragalia Lost (2020), Kirsty
 Nioh 2  (2020), Hide
Arknights (2020), Dur-Nar
The Last of Us: Part II (2020), Abby
Cyberpunk 2077 (2020), Hanako Arasaka
Famicom Detective Club: The Missing Heir (2021), Katsuko Ohnishi
Lost Epic (2022), Cecilia
Soul Hackers 2 (2022), Figue
Genshin Impact (2020), Arlecchino
Bayonetta 3 (2022), Madama Butterfly

Dubbing

Live-action
9/11, Tina (Olga Fonda)
Brotherhood of Blades II: The Infernal Battlefield, Ding Baiying (Xin Zhilei)
The Cider House Rules (Netflix edition), Candy Kendall (Charlize Theron)
Darkest Hour, Elizabeth Layton (Lily James)
The Darkest Minds, Cate (Mandy Moore)
Death on the Nile, Katherine (Susannah Fielding)
Debris, Finola Jones (Riann Steele)
The Driftless Area, Jean (Aubrey Plaza)
End of a Gun, Lisa Durant (Jade Ewen)
Euphoria, Jules Vaughn (Hunter Schafer)
Fantastic Beasts: The Crimes of Grindelwald, Leta Lestrange (Zoë Kravitz)
Freaky, Char Kessler (Dana Drori)
The Girl in the Spider's Web, Lisbeth Salander (Claire Foy)
Godzilla: King of the Monsters, Lauren Griffin (Elizabeth Ludlow)
The King's Man, Mata Hari (Valerie Pachner)
Mother, May I Sleep with Danger?, Pearl (Emily Meade)
Mother's Day, Kristin (Britt Robertson)
Pacific Rim: Uprising, Cadet Viktoria (Ivanna Sakhno)
Paris Can Wait, Carole (Élodie Navarre)
Prodigal Son, Ainsley Whitly (Halston Sage)
Roboshark, Veronica (Laura Dale)
Sharp Objects, Amma Crellin (Eliza Scanlen)
Solace, Agent Katherine Cowles (Abbie Cornish)
Spotlight, Sacha Pfeiffer (Rachel McAdams)
St. Elmo's Fire (2022 The Cinema edition), Dale Biberman (Andie MacDowell)
Texas Chainsaw Massacre, Melody (Sarah Yarkin)
The Third Way of Love, Jiang Xinyao (Jessie Chiang)
Underwater, Emily Haversham (Jessica Henwick)
Winning Time: The Rise of the Lakers Dynasty, Jeanie Buss (Hadley Robinson)

Animation
The Addams Family, Bethany
Miraculous: Tales of Ladybug & Cat Noir, Kagami Tsurugi

References

External links
Official agency profile 

1988 births
Living people
Japanese video game actresses
Japanese voice actresses
Mausu Promotion voice actors
Voice actresses from Fukuoka Prefecture
Voice actors from Fukuoka
21st-century Japanese actresses
Takarazuka Revue